Oksana Linde (b. 1948) is a Venezuelan composer and Electronic Music musician. Her debut album was released in 2022, featuring recording made during the 1980s.

Career
Linde was Born to Ukrainian immigrants in Caracas, Venezuela and learnt piano from an early age. She studied a Master of Science degree at the Venezuelan Institute for Scientific Research, but side effects from the chemicals she worked with caused demyelination, seizures, and memory loss, and she abandoned her studies.

Linde had already begun experimenting with creating music at this time and had played in some group projects with other students. After leaving her studies she purchased equipment for a home studio, including Casio CZ-1 and Polymoog synthesisers, a TEAC A-3440 reel-to-reel machine, Roland tape echo effect and others.

The first piece of music Oksana Linde composed was Descubrimiento in 1983. Two years later her piece Mariposas Acuaticas was included on the French compilation SNX, and between 1984-1986 she had recorded over thirty pieces, including some for TV, radio, and theatre. In 1991 she was included as part of the third Festival of Electronic Music in Caracas, but outside of some international radio play her work remained largely unreleased.

After having to care for her sick mother, Linde sold most of her instruments and recording equipment. She later began creating new music on a computer using audio editing software Audacity which was shared to Myspace and ReverbNation.

In 2019, her music came to the attention of Cher-ee-lee and Andrea Zarza Canova who included Linde's Reverie II on their Dream Tech compilation. This led to Luis Alvarado of Buh Records discovering her work and he organised the release of her debut album Aquatic And Other Worlds which compiled work recorded between 1983-1989. A second and third album compiling further archival recordings are planned for future release by Buh Records.

Since releasing Aquatic And Other Worlds, Oksana Linde's music has been likened to other early electronic musicians like Delia Derbyshire. In their review, Electronic Sound Magazine wrote she was closer to Wendy Carlos and Isao Tomita than Derbyshire, while The Wire likewise noted the comparisons to artists like Derbyshire and Carlos, and wrote the release of Linde's music was a lesson in how so many other female electronic composers were still unrecognised.

Discography 
Compilation appearances

 1985 - SNX - Hawai
 2020 - Dream Tech - Mana
 2022 - Below The Radar 39 - Wire Magazine

Albums

 2020 - Aquatic And Other Worlds (1983-1989) - Buh Records

References 

Venezuelan people of Ukrainian descent
Venezuelan electronic musicians

1948 births
Living people
20th-century Venezuelan musicians
Musicians from Caracas
21st-century Venezuelan musicians
20th-century women musicians
21st-century women musicians